Cauliflower cheese is a traditional British dish. It can be eaten as a main course, for lunch or dinner, or as a side dish.

Cauliflower cheese consists of pieces of cauliflower lightly boiled and covered with a milk-based cheese sauce, for which a mature cheese (such as cheddar) tends to be preferred. A more elaborate white sauce or cheddar cheese sauce flavoured with English mustard and nutmeg may also be used. People who eschew bland food use one third of Stilton in the cheese mix, and add tabasco to taste. The dish is often topped with grated cheese (sometimes mixed with bread crumbs). It is baked in the oven to finish it.

History

There is a recipe for cauliflower with Parmesan cheese in Mrs Beeton's Book of Household Management, first published in 1861. In the 19th and 20th centuries the dish was often served as an accompaniment to the roast meat and potatoes that were eaten for the traditional Sunday lunch, normally in the winter months.

In the UK, cauliflower cheese is now widely produced as a vegetarian ready meal, and is also popular as a pre-prepared baby food.

See also

 List of cheese dishes

External links
Recipe from A Book of Household Management by Isabella Beeton

British cuisine
Cheese dishes
Brassica oleracea dishes
Baked foods